XTX is a computer-on-module (COM) standard for x86-based embedded devices.  XTX adds PCI-Express, SATA, and LPC capabilities. The standard was promulgated by Advantech Corporation, Ampro, and Congatec.

References

External links

 
 "Next-gen computer module standard gains momentum" on LinuxDevices.com
 Supplier of Extreme Rugged and Industrial XTX products

Motherboard form factors
Computer standards